Le Catelier is a commune in the Seine-Maritime department in the Normandy region in northern France.

Geography

Population

Places of interest
 Traces of a castle at the hamlet of Pelletot.
 St.Laurent's chapel, dating from the eleventh century.
 The church of St. Georges, dating from the twelfth century.

See also
Communes of the Seine-Maritime department

References

Communes of Seine-Maritime